In an optical fiber, the normalized frequency, V (also called the V number), is given by

In multimode operation of an optical fiber having a power-law refractive index profile, the approximate number of bound modes (the mode volume), is given by

where g is the profile parameter, and V is the normalized frequency, which must be greater than 5 for the approximation to be valid.

For a step-index fiber, the mode volume is given by V2/2. For single-mode operation, it is required that V < 2.4048, the first root of the Bessel function J0.

See also 
 Abbe number

References 

Fiber optics